"21st Century Christmas" is a 2006 Christmas song released by Cliff Richard. It was released as a double A-side single alongside a new version of Richard's first hit "Move It" (featuring Queen guitarist Brian May).

Richard had achieved a UK number one single in each of the previous five decades, but not one in the sixth decade. The promotional release spruiked the opportunity that "Cliff has a great chance to make it to No 1 with this single - and it would ensure his record of No. 1 single in 6 consecutive decades becomes virtually unassailable." However, the single fell just short, reaching No. 2 on the UK Singles Chart.

The track was not included on Richard's contemporaneous album release, Two's Company - The Duets (given it was not a duet), but was included on Richard's subsequent compilation albums, The 50th Anniversary Album (2008) and 75 at 75 (2015).

Charts

References

External links
 
 Move It / 21st Century Christmas (promo edition) at 45worlds
 Cliff Richard - Single releases 1979 onwards

2006 singles
Cliff Richard songs
Songs written by Ralph Murphy (musician)
Songs written by Paul Brady
British Christmas songs